The 2012 Falsterbo Horse Show was the 2012 edition of the Falsterbo Horse Show, the Swedish official show jumping horse show. It was held as CSIO 5* and CDI 5*.

The first horse show were held 1920 in Falsterbo, in 1969 the first show jumping derby was held here.

The 2012 edition of the Falsterbo Horse Show was held between July 12, 2012, and July 15, 2012.

FEI Nations Cup of Sweden 
The 2012 FEI Nations Cup of Sweden was part of the 2012 Falsterbo Horse Show. It was the sixth competition of the 2012 FEI Nations Cup and was held on Friday, July 13, 2012, at 2:30 pm. The competing teams were: Ireland, Germany, Great Britain, Switzerland, the Netherlands, France, Sweden and Belgium.

The competition was a show jumping competition with two rounds and optionally one jump-off. The height of the fences were up to 1.60 meters.

The competition is endowed with 200,000 €.

(grey penalties points do not count for the team result)

JMS Falsterbo Derby 
The Falsterbo Derby is an important show jumping competition at the 2012 Falsterbo Horse Show. The sponsor of this competition is JMS. A Derby is a show jumping competition with special fences like walls or natural fences build of wood (another example of a derby competition in show jumping is the British Jumping Derby).

This competition will be held on Saturday, July 13, 2012, at 3:45 pm. The competition is a show jumping competition with one round and one jump-off.

(Top 5 of 25 Competitors)

Grand Prix Spécial (B-Final)
The 2012 Falsterbo Horse Show is the venue of the first competition of the World Dressage Masters (WDM) – rider ranking, season 2012/2013.

All competitors had started first in the Grand Prix de Dressage at Saturday. The eight best-placed competitors of the Grand Prix de Dressage were allowed to start in the A-Final (the Grand Prix Freestyle). If some of best-placed competitors had want to start in the B-Final, the same number of competitors, who are placed after the best-placed competitors, move up in the A-Final.

The Grand Prix Spécial is the B-Final of the World Dressage Masters competitions at 2012 Falsterbo Horse Show. The B-Final was held as Grand Prix Spécial, the competition with the highest definite level of dressage competitions. This year the shorter 2012 Olympic version was ridden.

The B-Final of the World Dressage Masters competitions at 2012 Falsterbo Horse Show was held on July 15, 2012, at 10:00 am. It was endowed with €20,000 .

(top 3 of 7 competitors)

Grand Prix Freestyle (A-Final) 
The Grand Prix Freestyle, the A-Final of the World Dressage Masters, is a Freestyle dressage competition. The level of this competition is at least the level of a Grand Prix de Dressage, but it can be higher than the level of a Grand Prix Spécial.

The Grand Prix Freestyle at the 2012 Falsterbo Horse Show was held on Sunday, July 15, 2012, at 12:15 noon. It was endowed with €70,000 .

(top 5 of 8 competitors)

Longines Falsterbo Grand Prix 
The Grand Prix was the mayor show jumping competition of the 2012 Falsterbo Horse Show. The sponsor of this competition was Longines. It was held on Sunday, July 15, 2012, at 2:30 pm. The competition was a show jumping competition with two rounds, the height of the fences were up to 1.60 meters.

(Top 5 of 44 Competitors)

References

External links 
 official website
 2012 show jumping results
 2012 dressage results

Falsterbo Horse Show
Falsterbo Horse Show
Falsterbo Horse Show
July 2012 sports events in Europe